is a Japanese manga series written and illustrated by Hiroyuki Nishimori. The story revolves around the adventures of 15-year-old schoolgirl Megumi Amatsuka, a popular and beautiful tomboy that always get into fights with a secret: she used to be a boy. It was serialized in Shogakukan's Weekly Shōnen Sunday from June 1999 to August 2003. Its chapters were collected in 20 tankōbon volumes. A 50-episode anime television series adaptation by TMS Entertainment was broadcast on TV Tokyo between April 2002 and March 2003. In 2001, the manga won the 46th Shogakukan Manga Award for the shōnen category.

Story
At the age of nine, Megumi is an aggressive boy prone to always fighting. One day he saves a strange man from a gang of other children. In return, Megumi receives a magical book. After accidentally bleeding on the book, a genie named Pierrot appears and offers to grant him a wish. Megumi wishes to become a strong man's man. Pierrot, a trickster, inadvertently turns Megumi into a woman. Megumi, furious, throws the book into the riverbank. Believing the only way to reverse the spell is to retrieve the book, Megumi begins a 6-year-long search but is told that she can find the book if she attends Furinkan High School.

Characters

While Megumi is physically a very attractive female, she still retains her masculine mannerisms and fighting abilities, which she uses very often, attracting the 'Megu-chan Protection Club', a group of misfit admirers. Nobody else knows she used to be a boy but was transformed into a girl; initially only Megumi's best friend, Miki, knew her secret, however the protection club quickly finds out. Out of all the men in Furinkan High, the only one who seems to make any headway is Genzō Soga for his unparalleled willingness to do anything to prove himself to Megumi. A tomboy at heart, if she unintentionally displays any sort of affection for anyone, she is very quick to deny everything. At the end of the manga, it is revealed that she was and always had been a girl. She wished to be a boy because when they were younger, despite being stronger than Genzō, he injured himself to protect her, saying that it was a man's duty to protect a woman, and she wanted to protect Miki from any harm. She confesses her love to Genzo at the end of the series, and kisses him.

Miki is Megumi's childhood friend and would do anything to help her. She is the only one that remembers the former Megumi and knows of the transformation. She does everything she can to turn Megumi into a better more feminine girl and even goes so far as to threaten to stop being Megumi's friend if she cuts her hair. Miki is extremely loyal to Megumi and has been at her side since pre-school, she even accepted an arranged marriage just so she could go to the same high school as Megumi.

A spoiled brat and Megumi's rival. She shows up later in the series. She suffers a form of superiority complex. She hates Megumi because she realizes that everyone around her thinks Megumi is more beautiful than she is. Now she follows Megumi where ever she goes in hope of dis-proving Megumi's beauty.

His real name is unknown. Megu-papa is perverted like Yasuda, frequently seen entering Megumi's room through secret entrances he creates without Megumi's permission.

Megumi's mother. Her work requires her to travel around the world, so she is rarely at home.

Megu-chan Protection Club

A very stubborn punk who has become Megumi's biggest admirer. The strongest in terms of physical power, Genzō is feared by many at school and various gangs in the city. The manga begins with Megumi, upset that this punk has mistreated his most recent girlfriend, beating Genzō up, the first person to do it since at least grade-school. Soon after that incident, Genzō quickly falls head over heels in love for Megumi. On his 16th birthday, Genzō proposed to Megumi but he was rejected. In the manga, it is revealed that Genzō received his scar protecting Megu from falling glass while she was rescuing Miki from kidnappers. Genzō often refers to Megumi as Megu-chan as a sign affection. At the end of the manga, Megumi reciprocates his feelings, and the two kiss.

An "average" boy trying to escape his reputation for being weird and a pervert at his previous school. While appearing physically inferior to Genzō, he has fought to defend himself and Megumi on several occasions. Near the end of the series, he seemed to have accepted the role as Yoshimi's 'Prince'.

The perverted and yet good-hearted nerd who nosebleeds when he gets overly excited. Yasuda is the weakest when it comes to physical prowess, but his intelligence continues to surprise everyone and aids the group solving many problems. He has a little brother that looks like a mini version of him and the same personality. Yasuda looks like a cute girl when his glasses are removed.

A samurai in-training and arguably the most decent man in the group. Kobayashi is the second strongest, having learned martial arts since childhood. Near the end of the series he seems to develop some feelings for Miki.

Other characters

Amatsuka's housemaid. She was first seen in episode 11 of the anime. She was always seen in the anime as Megumi's investigator and a substitute for Tsubasa in times of need. She even helped Megu by revising the rules of Yamato Nadeshiko Cup in order for the rules to be fair and square.

First seen in episode 20 of the anime. He was supposed to be Miki's "fiance". He was beaten up by Genzō in duel when he posed as Miki's boyfriend to protect her. In later episodes, he planned to kidnap Miki but he was defeated by the Megu-group.

A thief that Megumi met in Osaka. She was first seen in episode 13 of the anime. She was saved by Megumi after a near-death experience. Along with Megumi, Genzō, and Fujiki, they've helped the police capture a yakuza. In later episodes, she helped Megumi find magic books, a bone, and a scroll (which of course, she obtained by stealing).

Keiko's friend. In later episodes, she fell in love with Genzō because he saved in the nick of time. Somehow, the feelings changed when she was saved by Fujiki, who caught her when she fell in a stairwell during their field trip to Kyoto. She calls Fujiki her "prince".

Genzō's "Big Sister". She was first seen in episode 26 of the anime. She saves Megumi when Genzō tries to "make her happy". She was amazed at how Megumi changed Genzō from a delinquent to a charming person. She wants Megumi to refer to her as "Onee-san".

A punk that Megumi and Genzō met during the Yamato Nadeshiko Cup. He was first seen in episode 38 of the anime. He was defeated by Genzō. In later episodes, he was hired by Takao Gakusan to kidnap Miki.

Media

Manga
Cheeky Angel, written and illustrated by Hiroyuki Nishimori, was published in Shogakukan's Weekly Shōnen Sunday on June 2, 1999 and finished on August 27, 2003. The individual chapters were compiled and published by Shogakukan in twenty tankōbon volumes, released between September 18, 1999 and September 18, 2003.

The manga was published in English by Viz Media. The twenty volumes were released between July 7, 2004 and January 9, 2008, Viz Media re-published the series digitally between May 12, 2015 and February 23, 2016. In March 2021, Viz Media confirmed that they no longer holds the series' license.

Volume list

Anime
A 50-episode anime television series adaptation, produced by TMS Entertainment and directed by Masaharu Okuwaki, was broadcast on TV Tokyo from April 6, 2002 to March 29, 2003. The series two opening themes are performed by Aiko Kitahara; grand blue (ep. #1–26) and "Sun rise train" (ep. #27–50). The series four ending themes are performed by U-ka Saegusa in dB; "Whenever I think of you" (ep. #1–13), "It's for you" (ep. #14–26), "Tears Go By" (ep. #27–37) and "Secret and Lies" (ep. #38–49), while the last episode featured the series first opening theme grand blue by Aiko Kitahara as ending theme.

Reception
In 2001, the manga won the 46th Shogakukan Manga Award for the shōnen category. Eduward M. Chavez, reviewing the first volume of the manga for Anime on DVD, said that the protagonist, Megumi "entertains and creates situations that are shocking and equally hilarious," praised the supporting case for being "pretty solid" and called the title "entertaining." In a review of volume 3, Chavez praised the character development of Megumi and the characters as a whole. Liann Cooper, in a review of Volume 1 of the manga, called it "quite funny and charming," the artwork ok, and an amusing concept, although he said that "Megumi's situations get old" and hoped that later volumes would have more storyline, saying he only found the manga "mildly entertaining. Cooper later said that he enjoyed volume 2, saying it blew him away artistically, fitting "the bill for being an enjoyable series."
Janet Crocker called Volume 1 of the manga enjoyable, saying that while it seemed like Ranma ½, the story is "highly interesting," has fast pacing, a lot of "fight action," the issue of gender identity taken "very seriously," and calls it a "great manga." Holly Ellingwood, who reviews Volume 16 of the anime called it a "very unusual drama" which is "intriguing" and how she is trying to accept herself with the "full knowledge the she is a guy despite her female body," adding that the manga is "distinct story with an equally uniquely stylized art style."

J.P. Arevalo describes the anime as having " laugh-out-loud humor" and praised its blend of drama and comedy. B. Zuleika of Fandom says that the series addresses several gender identity questions, like what it means "to be a woman or a man" and how a person decides "who they are inside."

References

External links
 
IMDB Entry

1999 manga
2002 anime television series debuts
Action anime and manga
Fantasy anime and manga
Japanese LGBT-related animated television series
Romantic comedy anime and manga
Shogakukan manga
Shōnen manga
TMS Entertainment
Transgender in anime and manga
TV Tokyo original programming
Viz Media manga
Winners of the Shogakukan Manga Award for shōnen manga